Pietro Frescobaldi (died 1654) was a Roman Catholic prelate who served as Bishop of San Miniato (1654).

Biography
On 19 Oct 1654, Pietro Frescobaldi was appointed during the papacy of Pope Innocent X as Bishop of San Miniato.
On 28 Oct 1654, he was consecrated bishop by Marcantonio Franciotti, Cardinal-Priest of Santa Maria della Pace, with Onorato Onorati, Bishop of Urbania e Sant'Angelo in Vado, and Vincenzo Candiotti, Bishop of Bagnoregio, serving as co-consecrators.
He served as Bishop of San Miniato until his death on 11 Dec 1654.

References

External links and additional sources
 (for Chronology of Bishops) 
 (for Chronology of Bishops)  

17th-century Italian Roman Catholic bishops
Bishops appointed by Pope Innocent X
1654 deaths